The eighth election to the Carmarthenshire County Council was held in March 1910. It was preceded by the 1907 election and followed by the 1913 election.

Overview of the result

The Liberals retained a strong majority although the elections were far less politicized than in previous years. With a few exceptions, members were returned unopposed. The local press did not, on the whole, report the political affiliations of candidates but this was more explicitly noted in the Cardiff-based Weekly Mail.

Boundary changes

There were no boundary changes that occurred.

Candidates

There were only a small number of contested elections with one retiring alderman, John Lewis, seeking election as a councillor.

Three of those elected at the first election in 1889, and who had served continuosly since then, sought re-election.  Sir James Drummond, C.E. Morris and D,C. Parry (Llanelli) were all returned unopposed.

Outcome

There was very little hange in the political complexion of the council.

The eighth council

John Johns (Liberal, Llansteffan) was elected chairman at the 1910 statutoty meeting but died suddenly within the month.

At the June quarterly meeeting, the vice-chairman, Alderman John Bevan, Llansadwrn, declined to be nominated for the chair and the Rev. Alfred Fuller-Mills was elected unanimously.

Ward results

Abergwili

Ammanford

Bettws

Caio

Carmarthen Eastern Ward (Lower Division)
Brigstocke, the member for many years, was defeated.

Carmarthen Eastern Ward (Upper Division)

Carmarthen Western Ward (Lower Division)

Carmarthen Western Ward (Upper Division)

Cenarth

Cilycwm

Conwil

Kidwelly

Laugharne

Llanarthney

Llanboidy

Llandebie

Llandilo Rural

Llandilo Urban

Llandovery

Llandyssilio

Llanedy

Llanegwad

Llanelly Division.1

Llanelly Division 2

Llanelly Division 3

Llanelly Division 4

Llanelly Division 5

Llanelly Division 6

Llanelly Division 7

Llanelly Division 8

Llanelly Rural, Berwick

Llanelly Rural, Hengoed

Llanelly Rural, Westfa and Glyn

Llanfihangel Aberbythick

Llanfihangel-ar-Arth

Llangadock

Llangeler

Llangendeirne

Llangennech

Llangunnor

Llanon

Llansawel

Llanstephan

Llanybyther

Mothvey

Pembrey North

Pembrey South

Quarter Bach

Rhydcymmerai

St Clears

St Ishmael

Trelech

Whitland

Election of aldermen

In addition to the 51 councillors the council consisted of 17 county aldermen. Aldermen were elected by the council, and served a six-year term. 

Following the elections the following eight retiring aldermen were re-elected:
John Williams, 
W.N. Jones, 
D.L. Jones, 
R.W. Stephens, 
John Rees, 
Thomas Jones, 
Rev Thomas Johns, 
Rev William Davies,

One new alderman was elected
John Lloyd, elected member for Abergwili

One retiring alderman successfully sought election as a councillor and was not re-elected as alderman:
John Lewis

All nine aldermen elected were Liberals.

By-elections between 1910 and 1913

Llansteffan by-election 1910

A by-election was held in May 1910 following the sudden death of John Johns, chairman of the council. His son, Walter Johns was initially nominated but withdrew in favour of another Liberal.

Llangeler by-election 1911

A by-election was held on 6 May 1911 following the death of Conservative councillor, Thomas Thomas. Colonel Lewes of llysnewydd was selected in his place and won a comfortable victory over the Liberal candidate. His son, Walter Johns was initially nominated but withdrew in favour of another Liberal.

References

1910
1910 Welsh local elections